PYT (Down With Me) is P.Y.T.'s debut album. It features the single "Same Ol Same Ol" featuring rapper Sarai and "PYT (Down With Me)". It also features a hidden track by Sarai.

Track listing

References

2001 debut albums
P.Y.T. (band) albums